Petter Fagerhaug (born 29 September 1997) is a Norwegian cyclist, who most recently rode for UCI ProTeam . He primary competes in cross-country mountain biking, but also occasionally on the road.

Major results
2016
 1st  Cross-country, National Mountain Bike Championships
2017
 1st  Cross-country, National Mountain Bike Championships
 3rd Overall UCI Under-23 Mountain Bike World Cup
1st Nové Město
2018
 1st Overall UCI Under-23 Mountain Bike World Cup
1st La Bresse
1st Val di Sole
1st Stellenbosch
 1st  Cross-country, National Mountain Bike Championships

References

External links

1997 births
Living people
Norwegian male cyclists
People from Gjerdrum
Sportspeople from Viken (county)